The 1986 Colonial Athletic Association baseball tournament was held at Harrington Field on the campus of East Carolina in Greenville, North Carolina, from May 15 through 18.  The event determined the champion of the Colonial Athletic Association for the 1986 season.  It was the first tournament, in the first year that the CAA sponsored baseball.  The winner of the tournament, fourth-seeded , earned the CAA's automatic bid to the 1986 NCAA Division I baseball tournament.

Format and seeding
The top four finishers based on winning percentage from the conference's round robin regular season faced off in a double-elimination tournament.

Bracket and results

Most Valuable Player
Kevin Sickinger was named Tournament Most Valuable Player.  Sickinger was a pitcher and designated hitter for Richmond.

References

Tournament
Colonial Athletic Association Baseball Tournament
Colonial Athletic Association baseball tournament
Colonial Athletic Association baseball tournament
Baseball in North Carolina
College sports in North Carolina
Greenville, North Carolina
Sports competitions in North Carolina
Tourist attractions in Pitt County, North Carolina